Kings Creek is a rural locality in the Toowoomba Region, Queensland, Australia.

History 
The locality takes its name from the creek, which was named after pastoralist Joseph King of the Pilton and Clifton pastoral runs during the  1840s.

An undated map shows allotments for sale in the township of King's Creek, situated on the "Clifton Estate". The allotments were adjacent to the South-Western railway line, close to King's Creek railway station, and the watercourse King's Creek. An article in the Darling Downs Gazette on 20 June 1885 notes the sale of allotments at the new township of King's Creek.

In 1907 a Methodist church was built at Kings Creek.

References 

Toowoomba Region
Localities in Queensland